Na (Nah) is a dialect of Bangni, a Sino-Tibetan language spoken in India. Na is spoken in 9 villages of Taksing Circle, Upper Subansiri District, Arunachal Pradesh (Pertin 1994:1). There are 4 clans, namely Chedar, Hafi, Tisi, and Hari.

References

Languages of Assam
Tani languages